John Hodgson (10 May 1922 – 1973) was an English footballer who played in the Football League for Leeds United and Middlesbrough.

External links
 John Hodgson stats at Neil Brown stat site

English footballers
English Football League players
Leeds United F.C. players
Middlesbrough F.C. players
1922 births
1973 deaths
Sportspeople from Seaham
Footballers from County Durham
Date of death missing
Association football goalkeepers